Phyllophora traillii is a small marine red alga.

Description
Phyllophora traillii is a small alga no more than 35 mm long. It grows from a small holdfast and a short stipe up to 3 mm long which spreads to a small flat blade which is oblong or with parallel sides. It branches once or twice. The fronds are formed with a compact medulla of large cells with a cortex of small cells in 2 or 3 layers.

Phyllophora traillii is named for George William Traill a Scottish phycologist and mineralogist.

Habitat
To be found growing on rock in the lower littoral into the sublittoral to a depth of 15 m.

Reproduction
The gametangial plants are dioecious, that is with separate male and female plants.

Distribution
Recorded from Great Britain, Ireland, Faeroes and the Atlantic coast of Europe from Sweden to France. Also from Canada and U.S.A.

References

Phyllophoraceae
Plants described in 1890